Dellvale is an unincorporated community in Norton County, Kansas, United States.

History
A post office was opened in Dellvale in 1890, and remained in operation until it was discontinued in 1961.

Education
The community is served by Norton USD 211 public school district.

References

Further reading

External links
 Norton County maps: Current, Historic, KDOT

Unincorporated communities in Norton County, Kansas
Unincorporated communities in Kansas